Michael Dermokaites was an 11th-century Byzantine hypostrategos of Debar. He is descended from the Byzantine noble Dermokaites family.

References

Sources 
Byzantium's Balkan frontier: a political study of the Northern Balkans, 900–1204, p. 130

11th-century Byzantine people
Byzantine generals
11th century in Serbia